Hedayat Mosque is a mosque in Tehran, Iran. The mosque played a significant role in Iranian religious revolutionary movements against the Pahlavi regime. This mosque was built and managed by Ayatollah Mahmoud Taleghani. The mosque resembles a minaret in a desert. At this time, the Hedayat Mosque was the most politically active.

History 
The mosque was built in 1327. Since then, Islamic theology has been taught. In modern times it was used by revolutionaries, fighting against Pahlavi and Ayatollah Mahmoud Taleghani.

Political activities

Mahmoud Taleghani attracted many people to participate in the programs of the mosque. He invited Ulama and other intellectuals to lecture there. Mohammad-Javad Bahonar lectured on the criticism of the situation of Hijab in Hedayat mosque. Among the most encouraged and attracted by Mahmoud Taleghani were Mostafa Chamran, Takhti, Navvab Safavi, Jalal Al Ahmad and Ali Shariati.

See also
Mahmoud Taleghani

References

Mosques in Tehran